Stanhoe is a village and civil parish in the English county of Norfolk, 6.4 miles (10.2 km) from the North Sea. The population including Bagthorpe with Barmer at the 2011 Census had increased to 289. For the purposes of local government, it falls within the district of King's Lynn and West Norfolk.

The village's name is perhaps from the Old English for "stony hill-spur.

For a period during the 19th century, its parish priest was Philip Ward, husband of Lord Nelson's daughter Horatia.

The village pub, The Duck Inn, is one of the UK’s Top 50 Gastropubs and were named The Good Food Guide Restaurant of the Year for the East of England

The nearest large village is Docking. Also near Stanhoe are to be found remains of Creake Abbey, near the village of North Creake.

Stanhoe was once served by Stanhoe railway station.

Notes

External links

stanhoe.org village website
norfolkcoast.co.uk

Villages in Norfolk
Civil parishes in Norfolk
King's Lynn and West Norfolk